Ivory Coast, also known as Côte d'Ivoire, elects on national level a head of state – the president – and a legislature. The president is elected for a five-year term by the people. The National Assembly (Assemblée Nationale) has 225 members, elected for a five-year term in single-seat constituencies. 
Côte d'Ivoire is a one party dominant state with the RHDP in power. Opposition parties are allowed, but are widely considered to have no real chance of gaining power. Following a peace deal between the government and former rebels in March 2007, the next elections were planned for early 2008. These elections however, were postponed to November 2009 first, and then to early 2010.

Latest elections

Presidential elections

Parliamentary elections

See also
 Electoral calendar
 Electoral system

References

External links
African Elections Database
Adam Carr's Election Archive